"Dirty City" is a rock song by Steve Winwood from his album Nine Lives, released on February 19, 2008.

The song features Eric Clapton on guitar and reached number one on Adult Album Alternative radio for three weeks.

References

2008 singles
Steve Winwood songs
Eric Clapton songs
Songs written by Steve Winwood
2008 songs
Sony BMG singles